All Pigs Must Die is the first EP by American supergroup of the same name. It was released in 2010 on Nonbeliever Records.

Track list

Personnel
All Pigs Must Die
Matt Woods – bass
Ben Koller – drums
Adam Wentworth – guitars
Kevin Baker – vocals

Production
Kurt Ballou – recording, mixing
John Golden – mastering

References

2010 EPs
All Pigs Must Die (band) albums
Albums produced by Kurt Ballou